Point Of View B.V. or commonly known as Point of View, POV is a computer hardware company that produces PCs (including all-in-one systems), tablets, gaming graphics cards/PC cases/mice and mouse pads, as well as other accessories such as headphones and Bluetooth dongles. It was established in the year 2000. Most of its sales are in Europe, as it serves more than 30 European countries. POV is based in the Netherlands. The company also includes Point of View Taiwan, Point of View China, Point of View Hong Kong, Point of View France and Point of View United States.

Products

External links 

 

Graphics hardware companies
Technology companies of the Netherlands
Computer companies established in 2000
2000 establishments in the Netherlands